Taekwondo at the 2005 Islamic Solidarity Games was held in Umm al-Qura University Hall, Mecca from April 11 to April 14, 2005.

Medalists

Medal table

References
 Results

2005 Islamic Solidarity Games
Islamic Solidarity Games
2005